Tigris Air was a charter airline based in Baghdad, Iraq that operated from 2005 to 2009.

Fleet 
The Tigris Air fleet consisted of the following aircraft:

References

External links
Tigris Air Fleet

Defunct airlines of Iraq
Airlines established in 2005
Airlines disestablished in 2009
Defunct charter airlines
Companies based in Baghdad
Iraqi companies established in 2005
2009 disestablishments in Iraq